Kentucky in Africa was a colony in present-day Montserrado County, Liberia, founded in 1828 and settled by American free people of color, many of them former slaves. A Kentucky state affiliate of the American Colonization Society, members raised money to transport black people from Kentucky — freeborn volunteers as well as slaves set free on the stipulation that they leave the United States — to Africa. The Kentucky society bought a  site along the Saint Paul River (quite near the site of the present-day capital city of Monrovia) and named it Kentucky in Africa. Clay-Ashland was the colony's main town.

Notable residents of Kentucky in Africa include William D. Coleman, the 13th President of Liberia, whose family settled in Clay-Ashland after immigrating from Fayette County, Kentucky, when he was a boy. Alfred Francis Russell, the 10th President of Liberia, also resided in Clay-Ashland.

Kentucky in Africa was annexed by Liberia in about 1847.

References

Montserrado County
History of Liberia
African-American history of Kentucky
Former colonies in Africa
American colonization movement
Populated places established by Americo-Liberians
Former polities incorporated into Liberia
African-American repatriation organizations
Repatriated Africans